Lynne Renee Roberts (born August 28, 1975) is the women's basketball head coach at the University of Utah. She has also served as head coach at Chico State and Pacific.

Early life and education
Roberts was born and raised in Redding, California. She would attend Enterprise High where she would earn 12 varsity letters and was awarded the 1993 Northern Section Player of the Year.

Roberts attended Seattle Pacific University, where she played for the Falcons. During her time with the Falcons (1993-1997), Roberts set a school record for 3-pointers made in one season at 82 and for three-point percentage in a game when she made 7 of 8 against Willamette. Roberts regards her most memorable moment at college when she made the game winning 3-pointers to defeat Division I's UC Davis Aggies. Roberts graduated in 1997 with a bachelor's degree in history.

Coaching career
After graduating from Seattle Pacific, Roberts remained to pursue a master's degree. While pursuing her master's degree, Roberts served as a student assistant for the Falcons. Over five seasons Roberts helped lead the Falcons to a 113-31 record and five straight NCAA Division 2 appearances. Roberts graduated with a master's degree in athletic administration in 2000.

In 2002 Roberts was hired as the head coach for Chico State, where she coached from 2002-2006 and amassed an 86-31 record. The Wildcats set school records for wins in both 2005 and 2006 while finishing first place in their conference. The 2005 title was the first CCAA title in Chico State history. That same season the Wildcats advanced to the NCAA Tournament West region Championship, and in 2006 the Wildcats would make it to the D2 Final Four.

In 2006 Roberts was hired as the head coach for the University of the Pacific. After a slow first few seasons, Roberts helped the Tigers post a record 27 wins in 2013. She won the Big West Conference coach of the year, and her team came to be known as the "Cardiac Kids." The Tigers made a school record 3 straight post-season appearances under Roberts. Roberts subsequently had her contract extended through 2017. 

In March 2015, Roberts was selected as one of three WCC coaches to be named co-coach of the year. The other two were Saint Mary's Gaels coach Paul Thomas and Gonzaga Bulldogs coach Lisa Fortier.

On April 20, 2015, it was announced that the University of Utah hired Roberts as their next head women's basketball coach. In her first season Roberts led Utah to an 18–15 record, Utah's first winning season since 2012–13.

Head coaching record
Sources:

Pac-12 2017-18 Season

Utah 2017-18 Women's Basketball Schedule

References 

1975 births
Living people
Basketball coaches from California
People from Redding, California
American women's basketball coaches
Chico State Wildcats
Pacific Tigers women's basketball coaches
Seattle Pacific Falcons women's basketball players
Seattle Pacific Falcons women's basketball coaches
Seattle Pacific University alumni
Utah Utes women's basketball coaches